The Wisconsin Department of Workforce Development (DWD) is an agency of the Wisconsin state government responsible for providing services to Wisconsin workers, employers, and job-seekers to meet Wisconsin's workforce needs.  To effect its mission, the Department administers unemployment benefits and workers' compensation programs for the state of Wisconsin; ensures compliance with state laws on wages and discrimination; provides job resources, training, and employment assistance for job-seekers; and engages with employers to help them find and maintain adequate staffing for their businesses.

The Department is headquartered in the State Labor Building, or GEF-1, in downtown Madison, Wisconsin.

History

In 1873, the Socialists of Milwaukee demanded that Wisconsin implement a new bureau to track industrial and labor statistics within the state.  They pushed for this to be adopted into the platform of the Democratic Party of Wisconsin that year, but were not successful.

The idea re-emerged in 1881 and 1882, when attempts were made in the Wisconsin Legislature to pass legislation which would create such an agency.  Finally, in 1883, Governor Jeremiah McLain Rusk, in his second annual message to the Legislature, endorsed the idea of a new state bureau to track industrial, agricultural, and labor statistics, saying, "The time has arrived when means should be provided for gathering accurate monthly crop and livestock reports during the growing season, and complete labor statistics, and their prompt circulation among the people. For this purpose I would recommend that you provide for a state bureau of agricultural and labor statistics."  The idea was popular with farmers as well as industrial workers, and was enacted in part during that session with the passage of 1883 Wisconsin Act 319, an Act to Create a Bureau of Labor Statistics. Later that year, Rusk appointed Wisconsin's first Labor Commissioner, Frank A. Flower.

In 1884, the Bureau published its first report, with the results of safety-related questions such as: "What height are your buildings; are they wood, brick or stone? Have you fire escapes? What kind? Have you apparatus for extinguishing fires?"  This was followed, in 1887, with Wisconsin's first industrial safety law, which required fences or guards around gears, shafts, bull-wheels, and pulleys, (1887 Wisc. Act 46) and, in 1889, legislation raised the minimum age of employment from 12 to 13 (1889 Wisc. Act 519).

In 1909, led by state senator Theodore W. Brazeau, the first attempt was made in the Legislature to pass workers' compensation.  The legislation did not pass in this session, but a joint legislative committee was established to study the problem.

In 1911, the Wisconsin Bureau of Labor Statistics was replaced by the Wisconsin Industrial Commission.  Governor Francis E. McGovern appointed Joseph D. Beck as the first head of the commission, with commissioners John R. Commons and Charles H. Crownhart.  The new commissioners were instrumental in a series of new legislation regulating hours, wages, and employment conditions.  They established free employment services in Milwaukee, Superior, La Crosse, and Oshkosh.  They passed the nation's first modern apprenticeship law, incorporating area vocational schools, training 625 apprentices in the first year.  One of the capstone achievements of this first Industrial Commission was the nation's first Workmen's Compensation Act in the state constitution, which guaranteed injury compensation as a legal right (1911 Wisc. Act 50).  The constitutionality of the act was later upheld by the Wisconsin Supreme Court and the Supreme Court of the United States.

In 1913, Wisconsin passed one of the first minimum wage laws in the United States, requiring that a "living wage" must be paid to any employed woman or minor.  A similar law in Oregon was challenged in the Supreme Court, but after it was allowed to go into effect, the Wisconsin Industrial Commission moved ahead with enforcing its living wage statute in 1919 with an initial living wage set at 22 cents.

In 1920, the commission hired Arthur J. Altmeyer as its chief statistician.  In 1922, under Governor John J. Blaine, Altmeyer became the Secretary of the Industrial Commission; he would serve under the next four governors.  Altmeyer, working with Governor Philip La Follette, achieved passage of the nation's first unemployment compensation law.  In 1933, Altmeyer was enlisted by new U.S. President Franklin Roosevelt to work on the President's Committee on Economic Security, where he would eventually become the first Commissioner of the Social Security Administration.  President Roosevelt would later refer to Altmeyer as the "Father" of Social Security.

Wisconsin issued its first unemployment compensation insurance August 17, 1936, to Neils N. Ruud for $15.  Ruud sold the check to Paul Raushenush for $25 for its historical value.  The check is now held by the Wisconsin Historical Society.

In 1937, Wisconsin created the Wisconsin Labor Relations Board, the predecessor to the current Wisconsin Employment Relations Commission.

In 1945, Wisconsin passed the Wisconsin Fair Employment Act (WFEA) (1945 Wisc. Act 490) and became one of the first three states to prohibit employment discrimination on the basis of race, religion, color, national origin, or ancestry.  Additional protections were added to the statute over time:  
 in 1959, protections were added for workers over age 40
 in 1961, for discrimination based on gender
 in 1965, Wisconsin was the first state to outlaw employment discrimination on the basis of handicap or disability
 in 1977, protections were added against discrimination absed on criminal record
 1982 saw a prohibition on discrimination on the basis marital status, and saw Wisconsin become the first state to ban employment discrimination on the basis of sexual orientation
 and in 1987, protections were added for members of the armed forces

In 1945, the Apprenticeship Division of the Industrial Commission also became the state approval agency for veterans enrolling in training under the G.I. Bill.

In 1967, a state commission under William R. Kellett, which had been appointed by Governor Warren P. Knowles, recommended the consolidation of labor-related state government functions under a new agency known as the Department of Industry, Labor & Human Relations (DILHR).

Following the passage of Social Security amendments in 1967, Wisconsin became the first state in the country to establish Work Incentive (WIN) programs in every county.  The Work Incentive program in Wisconsin was an important predecessor to the Wisconsin Works program of the 1990s, which became a model for other welfare-to-work programs in the U.S. and elsewhere.

The Occupational Safety and Health Act (OSHA), passed in 1970, allowed the DILHR to conclude their own job safety inspections for private industries.  However the Department would continue to enforce occupational safety and health codes for public employees until 1982, as these jobs were not yet covered under OSHA.

In 1988, the Legislature enacted the Wisconsin Family and Medical Leave Act, five years before the federal version passed.  That same year, the Wisconsin Job Service launched the Job Service Resume System, becoming the first state to link multiple states in a resume service.  Additional states were eventually added to the program, and, eventually, it was adopted by the United States Department of Labor as America's Job Bank.

In 1994, Governor Tommy Thompson's Work First initiative attempts to divert more applicants from Aid to Families with Dependent Children (AFDC) to employment opportunities.  AFDC was officially ended in Wisconsin in 1998 with the transition to Wisconsin Works (W-2).  The Wisconsin Works program received an  Innovations In American Government Award from the Ford Foundation in 1999.

Also in 1994, DILHR became one of the first state agencies to establish a presence on the internet, seeing it as a new avenue to provide job services, information, and assistance to the public.  This was followed, in 1997, by the Business Resource Network, a website to help Wisconsin businesses find useful information.  JobNet, a web-based system for matching applicants to employment opportunities began operation in 1996.  Between 1995 and 1996, Wisconsin closed nearly all of its local unemployment offices and became the first state in the nation to implement a telephone-based claims system.

In 1996, the Department of Workforce Development replaced DILHR.

2015 saw the introduction of the new Job Center of Wisconsin (JCW) website and the online Re-employment Services portal, for unemployment insurance claims management.

Organization

Leadership
The senior leadership of the Department consists of the Secretary, Deputy Secretary, and Assistant Deputy Secretary, along with the administrators heading up the divisions of the Department.
 Secretary: Amy Pechacek
 Deputy Secretary: Robert Cherry, Jr.
 Assistant Deputy Secretary: Danielle Williams
 Employment and Training: Chytania Brown 
 Equal Rights: Jesús Villa
 Operations: Lynda Jarstad
 Unemployment Insurance: Mark Reihl 
 Vocational Rehabilitation: Delora Newton
 Worker's Compensation: Steven Peters
 Chairman, Wisconsin Employment Relations Commission: James J. Daley

Divisions

Office of the Secretary
Subdivisions include:
 Office of Communications
 Office of Legal Counsel
 Legislative Liaison
 Office of Integrity & Accountability

Employment and Training
The Employment and Training Division works to produce and administer programs to help Wisconsin's workforce learn and train for jobs in demand, and help employers find and maintain the workforce they need.  Services are provided through the Wisconsin Job Center website and a network of public-private partnerships and job centers.

Subdivisions include:
 Bureau of Workforce Information & Technical Support
 Bureau of Apprenticeship Standards
 Bureau of Workforce Training
 Bureau of Job Service
 Office of Veteran Employment Services
 Office of Skills Development
 Office of IT Coordination
 Office of Special Initiatives

Equal Rights
The Equal Rights Division administers the state's laws prohibiting discrimination in employment, housing, and public accommodations, manages the state's family and medical leave law, and enforces laws on minimum wages, overtime pay, timely payment of wages, employment of minors, and notifications of business closings or mass layoffs.  This division also sets the state's prevailing wage, which must be paid for all state or municipal construction projects.

Subdivisions include:
 Office of Support Services
 IS Comprehensive Services
 Bureau of Hearings & Mediation
 Budget and Policy
 Bureau of Investigations

Operations
The Operations Division provides administrative support for the program divisions.

Subdivisions include:
 Bureau of Enterprise Solutions
 Bureau of Finance
 Bureau of General Services 
 Office of Policy and Budget
 Bureau of Procurement & Information Management
 Chief Information Officer & Bureau of Information Technology Services

Unemployment Insurance
The Unemployment Insurance Division collects payroll taxes from employers and facilitates proper distribution of benefits to unemployment claimants.  This includes adjudicating disputes, detecting fraud, collecting benefit overpayments, and administering the state's New Hire Reporting program.

Subdivisions include:
 Quality Control
 Bureau of Tax & Accounting
 Bureau of Legal Affairs
 Benefit Operations Bureau
 Bureau of Management & Information Services

Vocational Rehabilitation
The Vocational Rehabilitation Division works with employees, employers, and program partners to facilitate employment for people with disabilities as part of a federally funded program.

Subdivisions include:
 Bureau of Consumer Services
 Bureau of Management Services

Worker's Compensation
The Worker's Compensation Division ensures that private insurers and self-insured employers properly compensate workers with work-related injuries or illnesses, and adjudicates appeals arising from those claims.

Subdivisions include:
 Administrative Services Section
 Bureau of Claims Management
 Bureau of Insurance Programs
 Bureau of Legal Services

Wisconsin Employment Relations Commission
The Wisconsin Employment Relations Commission is a separate state commission administratively attached to the Department of Workforce Development.  It is tasked with administering labor-employer relations in order to avoid strikes, lockouts, or other interruptions to commerce.  They conduct labor elections, mediate collective bargaining disputes, and provide arbitration when grievances arise.  The commission also provides training to facilitate the parties working together to achieve their common goals.

Statutory Commissions
Separate from the ordinary organizational structure of the Department, there are a number of specific commissions created by acts of the Wisconsin Legislature to oversee, advise, or administer certain functions.
 Wisconsin Apprenticeship Advisory Council
 Council on Migrant Labor
 Self-insurers Council
 Unemployment Insurance Advisory Council
 Worker's Compensation Advisory Council
 Health Care Provider Advisory Committee

Special Committees
By executive order, the Governor of Wisconsin will from time-to-time appoint special committees to study a particular issue and advise the state.  There are a number of such committees currently working under the umbrella of the Department of Workforce Development:
 Joint Enforcement Task Force on Payroll Fraud and Worker Misclassification
 State Rehabilitation Council
 Governor's Council on Workforce Investment

Secretaries and Commissioners

Commissioners

Secretaries

See also
 United States Department of Labor
 Social Security Administration
 Personal Responsibility and Work Opportunity Act
 BadgerCare

References

External links
 Wisconsin Department of Workforce Development
 Wisconsin Employment Relations Commission
 Job Center of Wisconsin

State agencies of Wisconsin
State departments of labor of the United States
Government agencies established in 1996
1996 establishments in Wisconsin